The Governor of Taganrog was the head of the Taganrog borough or governorate (incorporated municipality with privileges given by royal charter), between October 8, 1802 and May 19, 1887.

Taganrog was also the center of uezd (including the cities of Rostov on Don, Nakhichevan on Don and Mariupol) from 1816 to 1834. Rostov was subordinated to Yekaterinoslav Governorate in 1834, while Nakhichevan and Mariupol remained within Taganrog's governorate until 1859.

Historical background
By the end of the 18th century, Taganrog lost its importance as a military base with Crimea and Azov Sea being under command of Imperial Russia. The cities on Black Sea and Azov Sea transformed into important trade centers. The trade development demanded new measures and Alexander I of Russia introduced the office of governors (градоначальник) who were in direct contact with him. The governorships (in different periods of time) were introduced in four Russian cities: Odessa, Taganrog, Feodosiya and Kerch. The emperor appointed to this post dynamic people with initiative. The post co-existed with the Head of the City or mayor and helped to develop trade and raise well-being of its citizens.

List of governors of Taganrog
Apollon Dashkov (1802–1805)
Baron Balthasar von Campenhausen (1805–1809)
Pyotr Papkov (1810–1822)
Nikolai Naumov (1822–1825)
Alexander Dunaev (1825–1832)
Baron Otto Pfeilizer-Frank (1832–1843)
Prince Alexander Lieven (1844–1853)
Count Nikolai Adlerberg (1853–1854)
Count Yegor Tolstoy (1854–1856)
Admiral Mikhail Lavrov (1856–1864)
Admiral Pavel Pereleshin (1864–1866)
Admiral Ivan Shestakov (1866–1868)
Admiral Lev Kultshitskiy (1868–1873)
Mayor Akhilles Alferaki as temporary governor from November 25, 1873 to December 31, 1873
Admiral Ivan Furugelm (Johan Hampus Furuhjelm) (1874–1876)
Rear-admiral Pavel Maksutov (1876–1882)
Rear-admiral Pavel Zelenoy (1882–1885)
Rear-admiral Ippolit Vogak (1885–1887)

Portraits of Taganrog governors

See also
History of Taganrog

References
 History of Taganrog by Pavel Filevskiy, Moscow; 1898.
 Taganrog Encyclopedia, Taganrog, 2002.

 
History of Taganrog